Sar Hammam (also Romanized as Sar Ḩammān; also known as Sar Ḩammām) is a village in Pazevar Rural District, Rudbast District, Babolsar County, Mazandaran Province, Iran. At the 2006 census, its population was 1,453, in 385 families.

References 

Populated places in Babolsar County